Northern Lights: A Journey to Love is a 2017 Filipino drama film directed by Dondon S. Santos and written by Onay Sales that stars Piolo Pascual, Yen Santos, and Raikko Mateo. The film is a collaboration between Regal Entertainment, Star Cinema, and Spring Films. The film's executive producers were Lily Monteverde, Roselle Monteverde, Charo Santos-Concio, Malou Santos, Piolo Pascual, Joyce Bernal, and Erickson Raymundo. The film was released on March 29, 2017.

Plot
Charlie Sr. (Piolo Pascual) is a Filipino immigrant in Alaska who is living a carefree life. His life suddenly changes when he is tasked to take care of his estranged son, Charlie Jr. (Raikko Mateo), whom he had left behind in the Philippines. As he struggles to become a real father to his son, Charlie crosses paths with Angel (Yen Santos), a quirky Filipina who went to Alaska to find her lost mother.

Cast

Main
Piolo Pascual as Charlie Sr.
Yen Santos as Angel 
Raikko Mateo as Charlie Jr.

Supporting
Joel Torre as Kado
Sandy Andolong as Juliet
Tirso Cruz III as Ricardo
Maricar Reyes as Joyce
Glydel Mercado as Leah
Jerald Napoles as James
K Brosas as Arlene

Production
Northern Lights was shot in and around Queenstown in South Island of New Zealand, to act as Alaska. The film employed production crew from Australia and New Zealand. On the other hand, the scenes with aurora borealis were actually shot in Alaska.

Reception
The film is graded "B" by the Cinema Evaluation Board of the Philippines.

Critical reception
Oggs Cruz of Rappler in a review wrote: "[the] most unfortunate about Northern Lights is that the film actually tries to define romantic relationships in a way that is not entirely escapist. The milieu has actual promise." He then concluded that there is nothing extraordinary about the film. Mari-an Santos of Philippine Entertainment Portal in a review wrote: "the story, though nothing groundbreaking, pulls the heartstrings and will appeal to a wide variety of audiences." She also added: "the development of their characters feels too abrupt, since the sequences do not flow as naturally as possible." Pablo A. Tariman of The Philippine Star in a very positive review of the film, wrote: "the story and screenplay were able to wield a solid film stunning in its simplicity but with a lot of soul in it." He then concluded that "it is a remarkably acted film and sensitively directed as well. The film tugs at your heart from beginning to end." For a Philippines-based audience, the film may drag a bit but it rapturously captures the slow rhythm of picturesque but sleepy locales like Anchorage and Fairbanks, Alaska.

References

External links

Official Trailer | 'Northern Lights: A Journey To Love' | Piolo Pascual, Yen Santos
'Northern Lights: A Journey To Love' Press Conference | Piolo Pascual, Yen Santos

2017 films
Films set in Alaska
Films shot in Alaska
Films shot in New Zealand
Philippine drama films
Regal Entertainment films
Star Cinema films
Films directed by Dondon Santos